The Heroes of Karn is a 1983 adventure game written by Ian Gray. It was released by Interceptor Micros for the Commodore 64, Amstrad CPC and ZX Spectrum. Music was written by Chris Cox. The Spectrum and Amstrad versions were adapted by David M. Banner with graphics by Terry Greer. A sequel, The Empire of Karn, was released in 1985 on the Commodore 64.

Gameplay
The player must rescue four heroes who have been magically imprisoned, and thus save the land of Karn from dominion by evil creatures. The heroes are Beren the swordsman, Istar the wizard, Haldir the Elf-lord, and Khadim the dwarf.

The game's parser accepts relatively complex sentences for the time (e.g. "attack giant clam with shovel"). The puzzles are mostly straightforward, involving the use of an object found elsewhere to defeat the creature that is impeding progress.  The creatures and NPCs in the game, including the heroes themselves, are rather inert and are very limited in their interactions. The game has 65 locations. The game is mostly text, with illustrations for some of the locations.

Reception
The Commodore 64 version of the game received criticism for slow loading of graphical scenes, which could take as long as several minutes to display completely.  The Spectrum and Amstrad CPC versions were by a different artist (Terry Greer) and quicker to draw.

References

External links

The Heroes of Karn at GameFAQs

1983 video games
Adventure games
Amstrad CPC games
Commodore 64 games
Fantasy video games
Single-player video games
Video games developed in the United Kingdom
ZX Spectrum games